Teiresia umbraculata is a species of beetle in the family Carabidae, the only species in the genus Teiresia.

References

Lebiinae